Liu Xia may refer to:

Liu Hsia (1942–2003), Republic of China writer
Liu Xia (badminton) (born 1955), Chinese badminton player
Liu Xia (judoka) (born 1979), Chinese judoka
Liu Xia (poet) (born 1961), Chinese poet and artist, widow of Liu Xiaobo

See also
Liuxia Subdistrict (留下街道), a subdistrict in Xihu District, Hangzhou, Zhejiang, China